Onyok may refer to

Typhoon Onyok in the Western Pacific 
Onyok Pineda (born 2010), Filipino child actor 
Mansueto Velasco (born 1974), also known as Onyok Velasco, Filipino boxer